The Golden Hum is the third and final studio album by American  band Remy Zero, released in 2001, produced for Elektra Records. The album became popular for the song "Save Me", which was featured as the theme song for the TV show Smallville on The WB and The CW. The song "Perfect Memory" was featured in two other episodes of the show (in seasons 1 and 4). "Perfect Memory" was also used in the film The Invisible.

Track listing
"The Golden Hum" [2:42]
"Glorious #1" [3:20]
"Out/In" [3:18]
"Bitter" [3:55]
"Perfect Memory" [4:29]
"Save Me" [4:44]
"Belong" [3:50]
"Over the Rails & Hollywood High" [3:44]
"Smile" [4:08]
"I'm Not Afraid" [2:58]
"Impossibility" [0:00 - 3:01]
Hidden Track: "Sub Balloon" [6:35 - 13:38]

Credits
Backing Vocals - The Unnatural Choir and their Pets
Engineer [Assistant] - Chris Steffen, Richard Ash
Engineer [Cole Stages] - Mr. Colson
Engineer [Digital] - Jason Lader, Joe Zook, Lars Fox , Mr. Colson
Engineer [Director Of Engineering] - Jack Joseph Puig
Engineer [Ocean Way Recording] - Joe Zook
Mastered By - Bob Ludwig
Mixed By - Jack Joseph Puig
Performer -Cedric LeMoyne, Cinjun Tate, Gregory Slay, Jeffrey Cain, Shelby Tate
Performer [Additional Musicians] - Jason Lader, Lenny Castro, Leslie Van Trease, Paul Cantelon, Tim Pierce
Producer - Jack Joseph Puig

External links
RemyZero.com

References

2001 albums
Remy Zero albums
Elektra Records albums